Damaramadugu is an agricultural village located in Buchireddipalem mandal of Nellore district, Andhra Pradesh, India.

External links

References
Villages in Nellore district